Senago is a comune (municipality) in the Metropolitan City of Milan in the Italian region Lombardy, located about  north of Milan.

Senago borders the following municipalities: Limbiate, Cesate, Paderno Dugnano, Garbagnate Milanese, Bollate.

The Villa San Carlo Borromeo is located in Senago. A historic residence, that has been built in the XIV century, it is immersed in a secular park of eleven hectares, 12 kilometers from Milan.

References

External links
 www.comune.senago.mi.it/

Cities and towns in Lombardy